Myanaung is a town in the Ayeyarwady Division of south-west Burma. It is the seat of the Myanaung Township in the Hinthada District. It has a population of 42,252.

References

External links
Satellite map at Maplandia.com

Populated places in Ayeyarwady Region